Randall House or Randall Farm may refer to:

Publisher
Randall House Publications, a U.S. publisher of Christian publications

Places
Truman-Randall House, Florence, Arizona, listed on the National Register of Historic Places in Pinal County, Arizona
Alfred Jason Randall House, Pine, Arizona, listed on the NRHP in Gila County, Arizona 
John Randall House, North Stonington, Connecticut, listed on the NRHP in New London County, Connecticut
T. W. Randall House, Silver Springs, Florida, listed on the NRHP in Marion County, Florida
Jacob Randall House, Pownal, Maine, listed on the NRHP in Cumberland County, Maine
Randall-Hildreth House, Topsham, Maine, listed on the NRHP in Sagadahoc County, Maine
Randall-Hale Homestead, Stow, Massachusetts, listed on the NRHP in Middlesex County, Massachusetts  
Randall House (Mayville, Michigan), an octagon house listed on the NRHP in Tuscola County, Michigan
Harry E. Randall House, Great Falls, Montana, listed on the NRHP in Cascade County, Montana
Randall Farm (Lee, New Hampshire), listed on the New Hampshire State Register of Historic Places
Randall Farm (Cortland, New York), listed on the NRHP in Cortland County, New York
Dr. Rufus Randall Residence, Bath, Ohio, listed on the NRHP in Summit County, Ohio 
Cornell-Randall-Bailey Roadhouse, Johnston, Rhode Island, listed on the NRHP in Providence County, Rhode Island
Melvin Harley Randall House, Centerville, Utah, listed on the NRHP in Davis County, Utah
Adin Randall House, Eau Claire, Wisconsin, listed on the NRHP in Eau Claire County, Wisconsin
 Randall House, Wolfville, Nova Scotia, a Community Museum
Brewster Randall House, Janesville, Wisconsin, listed on the NRHP in Rock County, Wisconsin

See also
Randall Building (disambiguation)
Camp Randall, Madison, Wisconsin 
Fort Randall, Pickstown, South Dakota